An Ghaeltacht is a Gaelic Athletic Association club from County Kerry. The club competes in the  Kerry Intermediate Football Championship. The Club also competes in the West Kerry Football Championship, Division 1 of the Kerry County League and the annual All Ireland Comórtas Peile na Gaeltachta.

Honours
 Comórtas Peile na Gaeltachta: (3) 1999, 2017, 2019
 Munster Senior Club Football Championship: (1) 2003
  Munster Intermediate Club Football Championship: (1) 2017
 Kerry Senior Football Championship: (2) 2001, 2003
 Kerry Senior Club Football Championship: (3) 2001, 2002, 2005
 Kerry Intermediate Football Championship: (3) 1933, 1998, 2017
 Kerry Junior Football Championship: (2) 1976, 1993
 Kerry Novice Football Championship: (1) 1992
 Kerry U21 Football Championship: (1) 2014
 Kerry County Senior League Division 1: (1) 2007
Kerry County Senior League Division 2: (1) 1988
Kerry County Senior League Division 3: (1) 1986
Kerry County Senior Development League: (1) 2022
 Kerry County Junior League: (4) 2007, 2008, 2019, 2020
 West Kerry Senior Football Championship: (11) 1970, 1991, 1997, 1998, 2000, 2001, 2002, 2006, 2008, 2015, 2017
 West Kerry Senior Football League: (4?) 1988, 2013, 2015, 2022
(not a complete list)

 West Kerry Junior Football Championship: (16) 1991, 1992, 1993, 1997, 1999, 2000, 2001, 2006, 2007, 2008, 2012, 2013, 2015, 2019, 2020, 2022 

 All Ireland Sevens Intermediate: (1) 2014

Current Panel
Seán Ó Luing
Colm Ó Muircheartaigh
Caoimhghín Ó Beaglaoich
Brian Ó Beaglaoich
Roibeard Ó Sé
Tomás Ó Sé
Séamus Jim Peig Ó Muircheartaigh
Cian Ó Murchú
PJ Mac Lámh
Éanna TP Ó Conchúir
Óigí Ó Sé
Franz Sauerland
Peadar Pól Sauerland
Bréanainn Ó Bruic
Colm Ó Gráinne
Cathal Ó Gairbhía
Pádraig Ó Sé
Ruairí Ó Beaglaoich
Dara Ó Sé

All Ireland Winning Players
Brian Ó Beaglaoich
Dara Ó Cinnéide
Rónán Ó Flatharta
Mícheál Ó Sé
Marc Ó Sé[3]
Darragh Ó Sé
Tomás Ó Sé
Páidí Ó Sé
Aodán Mac Gearailt
Tomás Ó Luing

Famous players

Dara Ó Cinnéide
Tomás Ó Flatharta
Rónán Ó Flatharta
Mícheál Ó Sé
Brian Ó Beaglaoich
Marc Ó Sé
Darragh Ó Sé
Tomás Ó Sé
Páidí Ó Sé
Aodán Mac Gearailt

County Championship Winning Captains
2001:Micí Ó Conchuir
2003:Darragh Ó Sé

2023 Coiste
Cathaoirleach: Dara Ó Cinnéide
Runaí: Conall Ó Ciobháin
Cisteoir: Deaghlán Ó Súilleabháin
P.R.O. Dáithí de Mordha

References

Gaelic games clubs in County Kerry
Gaelic football clubs in County Kerry
1930s establishments in Ireland